John Philliben (born 14 March 1964) is a Scottish former professional football player and manager.

Career
A schoolboy international, Philliben started his career at Stirling Albion. In 1982, he was part of the Scotland under-18 side which won the European Under-19 Championship, scoring in the final. He earned a £70,000 transfer to Doncaster Rovers in March 1984, becoming the club's record signing and went on to spend three years there, spending some time on loan to Cambridge United in 1986.

Philliben returned to Scotland in 1987 with Motherwell, where he spent ten years. In 1991, he helped them on their way to victory in the Scottish Cup. In 1998, Philliben left Motherwell and returned to first club Stirling Albion as player/manager, although he returned to Motherwell on 25 July 2008 for his testimonial match against West Ham United. Philliben spent two years in charge at Forthbank but could only guide the side to mid-table finishes and was sacked at the end of the 1999-2000. After returning to Motherwell as coach, Philliben was placed temporarily in charge with Miodrag Krivokapic after Billy Davies' sacking. Although then chief executive Pat Nevin said he had "not harmed his chances" of being appointed on a permanent basis, Eric Black was appointed instead.

As of May 2005, Philliben was working outside of football as a driving instructor in his native Stirling.

Honours

Player
Motherwell
Scottish Cup: 1990–91
Scottish Premier Division: Runner-up 1994–95

Scotland
European Under-18 Championship: 1982

Manager
Stirling Albion
Stirlingshire Cup: 1998–99

References

External links
 
 

1964 births
Footballers from Stirling
Living people
Scottish footballers
Scottish Football League players
English Football League players
Scottish football managers
Stirling Albion F.C. players
Doncaster Rovers F.C. players
Cambridge United F.C. players
Motherwell F.C. players
Stirling Albion F.C. managers
Motherwell F.C. non-playing staff
Association football defenders
Scottish Football League managers
Scotland youth international footballers